The Municipal Assembly is the highest authority in the municipality, which is directly elected by the citizens, in accordance with the law on local elections. The Municipal Assembly of Gjilan has 35 members.  Commune's powers and duties are exercised by the Municipal Assembly and its organs, unless otherwise provided by this Statute.  All members of the Municipal Assembly have equal and equal rights and opportunities to participate fully in the Assembly processes. The Municipal Assembly ensures that these rights and opportunities are included in its Statute and Rules of Procedure.

Committees
The Gjilan Assembly has 11 committees

 Committee for Politics and Finance
 Committee for Communities
 Committee for Health
 Committee for Education
 Committee for Economic and Agri-culture
 Committee for Urban planning and environmental protection
 Committee for Public Services, Housing, Protection and Rescue
 Committee for Culture, Youth and Sports
 Committee for Geodesy, Cadastre and Property
 Committee for Cross-border Cooperation
 Committee for Gender equality
 Committee for Spatial Planning

References

Gjilan
Local government in Kosovo